The Feigenbaumklippe is a rock formation in the Oker valley in the Harz mountains of central Germany. They lie on the hiking trail from the Kästeklippen crags to Romkerhall Waterfall. These granite rocks, which show clear signs of "wool sack weathering" (Wollsackverwitterung) are a favourite destination for hikers and offer a good view of the valley towards the west. The observation point has safety railings.

References 

Rock formations of the Harz
Rock formations of Lower Saxony